Cathal Moynihan (born 14 February 1981) is an Irish rower. He competed in the men's lightweight coxless four event at the 2008 Summer Olympics.

References

External links
 

1981 births
Living people
Irish male rowers
Olympic rowers of Ireland
Rowers at the 2008 Summer Olympics
Sportspeople from County Kerry
21st-century Irish people